Ajjahalli, Magadi  is a village in the southern state of Karnataka, India. It is located in the Magadi taluk of Bangalore Rural district.

See also
 Bangalore Rural
 Districts of Karnataka

References

External links
 Official website Bangalore Rural District

Villages in Bangalore Rural district